Senator Joseph Sarwuan Tarka (1932–1980) was a Nigerian politician from Benue State and a former minister for Transport and then Communications under General Yakubu Gowon. He was one of the founding members of the United Middle Belt Congress, a political organization dedicated to protecting and advocating for the country's Middle Belt.

Background
Tarka was born on 10 July 1932 in Igbor, Benue State to the family of Tarka Nachi and Ikpa Anyam. His father was a village teacher of Tiv origin who later became a headmaster and then chief in Mbakor, Gboko area. He attended Native Authority Primary School, Gboko and Katsina Ala Middle School. 
After completing his education, he became a teacher at Katsina-Ala Middle School before going on to further studies at Bauchi Rural Science School.
He was a member of the Tiv Native Authority Staff Union and of the Northern Teachers Association.

First Republic
In 1954, on a ticket that was allied with the Middle Belt People's Party, Tarka was elected to represent the Jemgbagh constituency in the Federal House of Representative. In 1957, the Middle Belt People's Party merged with the David Lot led Middle Zone League to form the United Middle Belt Congress. 
Tarka then emerged as President of the United Middle Belt Congress (UMBC), the party soon formed an alliance with the Action Group, the dominant party in the Western Region. Action Group wanted support for the merger of Ilorin and Kabba with the Western Region and UMBC wanted the creation of a Middle Belt State. Tarka was a nominated member to the Nigerian Constitutional Conference of 1957 and was also the representative of the Middle Belt zone to the Willinks Commission of 1958. In 1958, he was appointed as a shadow minister of commerce. 
Tarka's UMBC, a predominantly Christian party contested the pre-independence election of 1959 and the subsequent election of 1963 against the mainly Moslem Northern People's Congress. Both elections led to violence in the Middle Belt, which contributed to the Major Chukwuma Kaduna Nzeogwu's inspired military take-over on January 15, 1966. Tarka was an advocate of state creation to give politically and economically empower minority groups within the country. He supported the creation of a Middle Belt state before the republic was truncated.

In April 1961, a year after a crisis in Tiv land, Tarka was detained for three weeks in Jos under the cloud of investigation for treason and inciting unrest during the Tiv disturbances., his arrest was a month away from regional elections. In 1962, UMBC which was partly funded by the Action Group decided to end their alliance for a new one with NEPU. The new party was called Northern People's Front with Aminu Kano as President and Tarka as General Secretary.

In 1962, along with other Action Group leaders, he was arrested on charges of treasonable felony but was acquitted for lack of evidence.

Later career
After General Gowon took charge in August 1966, Tarka was appointed Federal Commissioner of Transport and then of Communications, resigning in 1974 after allegations of corruption from a fellow-Tiv named Godwin Daboh were published. Daboh's action was allegedly instigated by Paul Unongo and Benue-Plateau State Governor Joseph Gomwalk and a police probe into the allegations was led by Sunday Adewusi.

In the lead-up to restoration of democracy with the Nigerian Second Republic, Tarka aligned with northern politicians to form the National Party of Nigeria, on which platform he unsuccessfully competed in the Presidential elections. He was elected Senator for Benue East in 1979, and was appointed chairman of the Senate Committee on Finance and Appropriation, a position he held when he died on 30 March 1980, aged 48.

His son, Simeon Tarka, was elected to the House of Representatives in 1979.

References

1932 births
1980 deaths
People from Benue State
Government ministers of Nigeria
Tiv people